The tribe Amorpheae is an early-branching clade within the flowering plant subfamily Faboideae or Papilionaceae. It is found from Mexico to Argentina. It was recently found to belong in a larger clade known informally as the dalbergioids sensu lato. This tribe is consistently resolved as monophyletic in molecular phylogenetic analyses. It is estimated to have arisen 36.9 ± 3.0 million years ago (in the Eocene). A node-based definition for Amorpheae is: "the MRCA of Psorothamnus arborescens and Eysenhardtia orthocarpa." The tribe exhibits the following morphological synapomorphies: "epidermal glands throughout the plant body; dry, indehiscent fruits that are single-seeded; and terminal inflorescences."

Subclades and genera

Amorphoids
The amorphoids can be distinguished from the daleoids on the basis of their non-papilionaceous flowers.
 Amorpha L.
 Apoplanesia C. Presl

 Errazurizia Phil.
 Eysenhardtia Kunth
 Parryella Torr. & A. Gray

Daleoids
The daleoids can be distinguished from the amorphoids on the basis of their generally papilionaceous corollas.
 Dalea L.
 Marina Liebm.
 Psorothamnus Rydb.

References

 
Fabaceae tribes